Carrie-Lynn Cohen (born March 7, 1967) is a Canadian former professional tennis player.

Tennis career
Cohen played collegiate tennis for Oklahoma State University and won a Big Eight conference title in 1986 at No. 4 singles.

On the professional tour she reached a best singles world ranking of 353 and made her only WTA Tour main draw appearance came as a qualifier at the 1988 Canadian Open.

At the 1984 Maccabiah Pan American Games in Sao Paulo, Brazil, she won a gold medal in women's singles and a bronze medal in women's doubles.

Cohen competed in the 1985 Maccabiah Games and the 1989 Maccabiah Games in Israel, representing of Canada.

References

External links
 
 

1967 births
Living people
Canadian female tennis players
Competitors at the 1985 Maccabiah Games
Competitors at the 1989 Maccabiah Games
Oklahoma State Cowgirls tennis players
Maccabiah Games tennis players
Maccabiah Games competitors for Canada
Jewish tennis players
Jewish Canadian sportspeople